The Technical Cooperation Program (TTCP) is a long-standing international organisation concerned with cooperation on defence science and technology matters, including national security and civil defence. Its membership comprises Australia, Canada, New Zealand, the United Kingdom (UK) and the United States (US).

History

Declaration Of Common Purpose

TTCP commenced in 1957 as a bilateral activity between the United Kingdom and the United States when the US President and the UK Prime Minister made the following Declaration of Common Purpose:

Tripartite Technical Cooperation Program

Immediately following the Declaration of Common Purpose, the Canadian government subscribed to the principle of interdependence and was admitted by the UK and the US. The resulting arrangement was known as the Tripartite Technical Cooperation Program (or TTCP for short).

Australia and New Zealand

Australia joined TTCP in 1965; the organisation's name was changed from Tripartite Technical Cooperation Program to The Technical Cooperation Program, which allowed the abbreviation for the organisation to be kept as TTCP. New Zealand joined TTCP in 1969.

Organisation

Top level

The organisation of TTCP is headed up by a senior official from each of the five participating nations, known collectively as the Principals. Supporting the Principals are their TTCP Deputies, based in Washington, and a secretariat.

Technical organisation 
Reporting to the Principals are a number of multilateral "TTCP Groups", each comprising Technical Panels and time limited Action Groups. In April 2009 there were 11 TTCP Groups:
 Aerospace Systems Group
 Chemical, Biological & Radiological Defence Group (CBR)
 Conventional Weapons Technology Group
 Command, Control, Communications & Information Systems Group (C3I)
 Electronic Warfare Systems Group (EW)
 Human Resources & Performance Group (HUM)
 Joint Systems & Analysis Group (JSA)
 Land Systems Group
 Maritime Systems Group
 Materials & Processing Technology Group
 Sensors Group

Each Technical Panel is expected to establish and monitor major collaborative projects in priority areas of defined mutual national interest. An Action Group is more limited in scope than a Technical Panel and has clearly stated objectives and preset milestones. It is formed by a "TTCP Group" to address a specific high priority problem and is terminated on completion of its assignment.

With the cutbacks in US and Australian defense/defence spending at the start of the 2010s, international face-to-face interaction in TTCP has been severely reduced.

The "Five Eyes" and other international organisations

Three TTCP nations (Canada, UK and the US) are also members of the NATO Research and Technology Organisation. Four of the nations (Australia, Canada, UK and US) are also members of the twenty seven nation Multilateral Interoperability Programme. Of the five TTCP nations, only the UK has ever been a member of the European Defence Agency.

Collectively the five nations comprising TTCP are often referred to as the "Five Eyes" community for intelligence and also participate in the following related activities:
 ABCA Armies: Australian, British, Canadian, United States and New Zealand Armies - originally Australian, British, Canadian and American Armies;
 Air and Space Interoperability Council (ASIC, for air forces);
 AUSCANNZUKUS: Australia, Canada, New Zealand, UK and US navies C4 organisation;
 Combined Communications Electronics Board (communication-electronics).
 Five Eyes (intelligence)
 UKUSA Agreement (signal intelligence)

See also 
 ECHELON
 CANZUK

Notes

References 

Anglosphere
International military organizations
Military science
Military technology